Semir Dacić (born 10 April 1999) is a Bosnian professional footballer who plays as a midfielder for First League of FBiH club TOŠK Tešanj.

References

External links
Semir Dacić at Sofascore

1999 births
Living people
Footballers from Sarajevo
Association football midfielders
Bosnia and Herzegovina footballers
FK Željezničar Sarajevo players
NK TOŠK Tešanj players
FK Novi Pazar players
Premier League of Bosnia and Herzegovina players
First League of the Federation of Bosnia and Herzegovina players
Serbian SuperLiga players
Bosnia and Herzegovina expatriate footballers
Expatriate footballers in Serbia
Bosnia and Herzegovina expatriate sportspeople in Serbia